FHE may refer to:

 European Humanist Federation
 Family Home Entertainment, an American home-video distributor
 Family Home Evening, a custom among Mormon families
 Forest Hills Eastern High School, in Ada, Michigan, United States
 Fully homomorphic encryption
 Haitian Chess Federation
 Hello (airline), a Swiss airline
 First Haydn Edition; see List of string quartets by Joseph Haydn
 Flexible Hybrid Electronics; see Flexible electronics